This is the discography page for American singer Taylor Dayne.

Studio albums

Compilations

Other album, soundtrack and compilation appearances 
 Envy - Ain't It a Sin (1987) - Backing Vocals : Atco Records – 90605-1 
 One Moment in Time: 1988 Summer Olympics Album (1988) - song: "Willpower"
 Fried Green Tomatoes soundtrack (1991) - song: "Danger, Heartbreak Dead Ahead"
 The Shadow soundtrack (1994) - song: "Original Sin"
 Saxtress Pamela Williams (1996) - song: "The Secret Garden"
 Searching For Jimi Hendrix (1999) - song: "The Wind Cries Mary"
 Flawless soundtrack (2000) - song: "Planet Love"
 Circuit soundtrack (2002) - song: "How Many"
 The Lizzie McGuire Movie soundtrack (2003) - song: "Supermodel"
 The Disco Ball live concert (2003) - performing "I Love the Nightlife (Disco 'Round)" and "Last Dance"
 Overtime Lee Ritenour (2005) - songs: "Papa Was a Rollin' Stone", "Is It You"
 Butch Queen RuPaul (2016) - song: "Be Someone"

Singles

Music videos

References

External links

Dayne, Taylor